The 2016 San Jose State Spartans football team represented San Jose State University in the 2016 NCAA Division I FBS football season. The Spartans were led by fourth-year head coach Ron Caragher and played their home games at Spartan Stadium. They were members of the Mountain West Conference in the West Division. They finished the season 4–8, 3–5 in Mountain West play to finish in a three-way tie for third place in the West Division.

On November 27, head coach Ron Caragher was fired. Caragher finished at San Jose State with a four-year record of 19–30.

Personnel

Coaching staff

Roster

Schedule 

Schedule Source: 2016 San Jose State Spartans football schedule

Game summaries

at Tulsa

 Passing leaders: Kenny Potter (SJSU): 16–28, 234 YDS, 1 TD, 1 INT; Dane Evans (TULSA): 12–23, 198 YDS, 1 TD
 Rushing leaders: Deontae Cooper (SJSU): 19 CAR, 43 YDS; D'Angelo Brewer (TULSA): 22 CAR, 164 YDS, 3 TD
 Receiving leaders: Rahshead Johnson (SJSU): 2 REC, 75 YDS, 1 TD; Keevan Lucas (TULSA): 6 REC, 112 YDS

Portland State 

 Passing leaders: Kenny Potter (SJSU): 14–20, 233 YDS, 3 TD; Alex Kuresa (PSU): 10–22, 135 YDS, 1 TD, 3 INT
 Rushing leaders: Deontae Cooper (SJSU): 18 CAR, 126 YDS, 1 TD; Paris Penn (PSU): 14 CAR, 137 YDS, 1 TD
 Receiving leaders: Tre Hartley (SJSU): 4 REC, 93 YDS, 1 TD; Alex Kuresa (PSU): 1 REC, 78 YDS, 1 TD

Utah 

 Passing leaders: Josh Love (SJSU): 11–21, 184 YDS, 1 TD, 1 INT; Troy Williams (UTAH): 20–28, 257 YDS, 1 TD, 1 INT
 Rushing leaders: Deontae Cooper (SJSU): 12 CAR, 45 YDS; Zack Moss (UTAH): 12 CAR, 95 YDS, 1 TD
 Receiving leaders: Tre Hartley (SJSU): 4 REC, 81 YDS; Tim Patrick (UTAH): 6 REC, 121 YDS, 1 TD

at Iowa State 

 Passing leaders: Josh Love (SJSU): 13–27, 155 YDS, 1 TD, 4 INT; Jacob Park (ISU): 15–19, 165 YDS, 3 TD
 Rushing leaders: Zamore Zigler (SJSU): 24 CAR, 104 YDS; Mike Warren (ISU): 19 CAR, 103 YDS, 1 TD
 Receiving leaders: Justin Holmes (SJSU): 3 REC, 48 YDS; Deshaunte Jones (ISU): 3 REC, 78 YDS, 2 TD

at New Mexico 

 Passing leaders: Kenny Potter (SJSU): 16–29, 314 YDS, 3 TD, 1 INT; Lamar Jordan (UNM): 4–8, 45 YDS, 1 INT
 Rushing leaders: Zamore Zigler (SJSU): 9 CAR, 91 YDS, 1 TD; Teriyon Gipson (UNM): 11 CAR, 156 YDS, 1 TD
 Receiving leaders: Justin Holmes (SJSU): 4 REC, 99 YDS; Tyrone Owens (UNM): 2 REC, 27 YDS

Hawaii 

 Passing leaders: Kenny Potter (SJSU): 16–30, 160 YDS, 1 TD, 3 INT; Dru Brown (HAW): 24–33, 287 YDS, 2 TD
 Rushing leaders: Malik Roberson (SJSU): 19 CAR, 91 YDS; Dru Brown (HAW): 6 CAR, 54 YDS, 1 TD
 Receiving leaders: Billy Freeman (SJSU): 3 REC, 51 YDS; Marcus Kemp (HAW): 6 REC, 69 YDS

Nevada 

 Passing leaders: Kenny Potter (SJSU): 11–17, 142 YDS; Tyler Stewart (NEV): 9–20, 144 YDS, 1 TD, 2 INT
 Rushing leaders: Malik Roberson (SJSU): 35 CAR, 139 YDS; James Butler (NEV): 20 CAR, 94 YDS
 Receiving leaders: Tre Hartley (SJSU): 5 REC, 76 YDS; James Butler (NEV): 3 REC, 92 YDS, 1 TD

at San Diego State 

 Passing leaders: Kenny Potter (SJSU): 13–29, 104 YDS; Christian Chapman (SDSU): 13–18, 167 YDS, 1 TD, 1 INT
 Rushing leaders: Kenny Potter (SJSU): 9 CAR, 42 YDS; Donnel Pumphrey (SDSU): 24 CAR, 135 YDS, 2 TD
 Receiving leaders: Tre Hartley (SJSU): 3 REC, 46 YDS; Rashaad Penny (SDSU): 2 REC, 64 YDS

UNLV 

 Passing leaders: Kenny Potter (SJSU): 24–39, 292 YDS, 2 TD; Kurt Palandech (UNLV): 10–21, 161 YDS, 1 TD, 1 INT
 Rushing leaders: Zamore Zigler (SJSU): 18 CAR, 77 YDS; Charles Williams (UNLV): 22 CAR, 141 YDS, 1 TD
 Receiving leaders: Tim Crawley (SJSU): 8 REC, 114 YDS; Devonte Boyd (UNLV): 6 REC, 136 YDS

at Boise State 

 Passing leaders: Kenny Potter (SJSU): 23–36, 278 YDS, 2 TD, 1 INT; Brett Rypien (BSU): 16–21, 219 YDS, 3 TD
 Rushing leaders: Malik Roberson (SJSU): 12 CAR, 109 YDS, 1 TD; Jeremy McNichols (BSU): 28 CAR, 158 YDS, 2 TD
 Receiving leaders: Justin Holmes (SJSU): 6 REC, 106 YDS, 1 TD; Cedrick Wilson Jr. (BSU): 6 REC, 102 YDS, 2 TD

Air Force 

 Passing leaders: Kenny Potter (SJSU): 25–37, 340 YDS, 2 TD, 2 INT; Arion Worthman (AF): 3–6, 33 YDS, 1 TD, 1 INT
 Rushing leaders: Kenny Potter (SJSU): 22 CAR, 52 YDS, 3 TD; Arion Worthman (AF): 28 CAR, 215 YDS, 2 TD
 Receiving leaders: Tim Crawley (SJSU): 11 REC, 147 YDS; Jalen Robinette (AF): 2 REC, 30 YDS, 1 TD

at Fresno State 

 Passing leaders: Kenny Potter (SJSU): 15–25, 111 YDS, 1 TD, 1 INT; Zach Kline (FRES): 10–17, 145 YDS
 Rushing leaders: Deontae Cooper (SJSU): 26 CAR, 126 YDS; Dontel James (FRES): 12 CAR, 42 YDS, 1 TD
 Receiving leaders: Justin Holmes (SJSU): 5 REC, 43 YDS; Aaron Peck (FRES): 6 REC, 63 YDS

References

San Jose State
San Jose State Spartans football seasons
San Jose State Spartans football